Tryvannshøyden, Tryvannshøgda or Tryvasshøgda is a hill in Oslo, Norway, peaking 529 metres above mean sea level.

It is named after the nearby lake Tryvann. It is known as transmitter site consisting of  Tryvannstårnet and a guyed TV mast. From 1934 to 1966 the hill featured a speed skating venue, Tryvand stadion.

Mountains of Oslo